The 2002 House elections in Hawaii occurred on November 5, 2002 to elect the members of the State of Hawaii's delegation to the United States House of Representatives. Hawaii had two seats in the House, apportioned according to the 2000 United States Census.

These elections were held concurrently with the United States Senate elections of 2002, the United States House elections in other states, and various state and local elections.

Of Hawaii's Congressional districts, the race in the 2nd district received the most attention. Representative Patsy Mink, despite her death following renomination, was posthumously re-elected, thus triggering a subsequent special election to fill the vacancy.

Overview

Results

References

2002
Hawaii
2002 Hawaii elections